"B.D.D." is a hit single by British group Groundhogs. Standing for "Blind, Deaf, Dumb" and taken from their 1969 Album "Blues Obituary", it was a commercial failure in the UK but made number one in Lebanon.

References

1969 singles
1969 songs
Liberty Records singles